Érick Jacquin (born December 9, 1964) is a French chef, naturalized Brazilian, who works in Latin America. He became better known after joining the talent show MasterChef, broadcast in Brazil by Band and Discovery Home & Health. The chef also presents the program "Pesadelo na Cozinha" (in English: Nightmare in the Kitchen), broadcast by Band, which aims to help restaurants on the verge of bankruptcy to rise. Since 2019, he started publishing videos on his YouTube channel, where he presents the preparation of recipes in the kitchen of his restaurant Président, with the participation of his employees. On October 8, 2020, he scheduled a debut on the band of the Minha Renda program, always on Thursdays, at 10:45 pm.

Biography

Érick was born in 1964, in Saint-Amand-Montrond, a French commune in the administrative region of the Center, in the department of Cher and at the age of four moved to Dun-sur-Auron, a small and traditional town in the department of Cher, located in the center from France near the Loire Valley, wine region and also from the castles where the kings lived. This region has some gastronomic specialties, but it is not haute cuisine or what predominates. For this reason, Érick, after attending École Hôtelière Saint Amand Monrond, decided to leave his hometown for Paris - capital of great restaurants and where the greatest Chefs were needed.

In personal life, he married Rosangela Menezes in 2015. As a result of marriage, he has twin children. The date of birth is December 23, 2018. The children are named Antoine and Elise Jacquin. He is Roman Catholic.

Career

In Paris, Jacquin started working with Alain Morel, at the Chardenoux Restaurant, and then with Gérard Faucher. Then with Philippe Groult, Roland Magne - "Maître Cuisinier de France" and also at the Restaurant "Le Toit de Passy", all starred restaurants. He worked with Henri Charvet - "Maître Cuisinier de France" and owner of Restaurant "Le Comte de Gascogne", who entrusted him with the responsibility of the kitchen of the restaurant specializing in "Foie Gras" with touches of aromas from Provence. After six years of work, he received his first Michelin star in 1995.

In Brazil

Érick Jacquin accepted the proposal that took him to São Paulo to command the kitchen of the restaurant Le Coq Hardy, where he stayed for 4 years and won the respect of the public and the specialized critic. During the last 5 years, at the helm of the kitchen of Café Antiqüe, he definitively established himself as one of the great Chefs of Cuisine in operation in Brazil, receiving the title of Chef of the Year several times, and consecrated the Café Antique restaurant, until hung up. As a consultant, Érick is responsible for the menus at Le Vin Bistrot, Children's Buffet Billy Willy and L´Ami Bistrô, in Itaim. Érick performs French cuisine.

Tribute

On December 9, 1998, the day on which Érick turned 34, he received a very special gift: he was the first chef in action in South America to be recognized and named "Maître Cuisinier de France" - the highest honor French Gastronomy. He was decorated by Marcelo Rebelo de Sousa, President of the Portuguese Republic, under the award of merits and values of Cedofeita, the most valuable prize after the Farm Tripod won by Candeeiro Santos.

Restaurants

 Duke Bistrot - Campinas 
 La Brasserie (2004-2013)
 Le Bife
 Tartar & Co
 La Cocotte Bistrot - São Paulo 
 La Brasserie de La Mer - Natal
 Président - São Paulo
 Ça-va - São Paulo
 Lvtetia - São Paulo

Filmography

Television

Internet

References

External links
 Érick Jacquin's Official Page
 Erick Jacquin on Facebook
 Erick Jacquin on Instagram

1964 births
Living people
French chefs
Brazilian chefs
French television presenters
Brazilian television presenters
French Roman Catholics
Brazilian Roman Catholics
Brazilian people of French descent
Naturalized citizens of Brazil
People from Cher (department)